Louisiana Lottery can refer to:

Louisiana State Lottery Company, a private lottery operated in the mid-19th century
Louisiana Lottery Corporation, the current lottery operated by the government of Louisiana